The Indonesia women's national under-18 basketball team is a national basketball team of Indonesia, administered by the Indonesian Basketball Association "PERBASI".

It represents the country in international under-18 (under age 18) women's basketball competitions.

Competitions

FIBA Women's Asia Cup

All-time record against other nations
Last match update: 10 September 2022

See also
Indonesia women's national basketball team
Indonesia women's national under-16 basketball team
Indonesia men's national under-18 basketball team

References

External links
 Archived records of Indonesia team participations

under
Women's national under-18 basketball teams